The 2017 Japanese Olympic Curling Trials were held from September 8 to 11 at the Advics Tokoro Curling Hall in Tokoro, Japan. The winning team represented Japan at the 2018 Winter Olympics. There was only a women's event, as the Yusuke Morozumi rink had already been chosen to represent Japan in men's curling.

The LS Kitami rink, skipped by Satsuki Fujisawa, won the event 3-1 over the Chubu Electric Power rink, skipped by Chiaki Matsumura.

Scores

Draw 1
September 8, 13:00

Draw 2
September 9, 09:00

Draw 3
September 9, 15:30

Draw 4
September 10, 09:00

References

External links

2017 in women's curling
Women's curling competitions in Japan
2017 in Japanese women's sport
Curling at the 2018 Winter Olympics
October 2017 sports events in Japan
Olympic Curling Trials
Japan at the Winter Olympics
Qualification tournaments for the 2018 Winter Olympics
Sport in Hokkaido
September 2017 sports events in Japan